Qué Pasa (Spanish: What's Happening?) was a print lifestyle and news magazine published in Santiago, Chile. Founded in 1971, the magazine became an online publication from May 2018.

History and profile
Qué Pasa began publication in 1971. The magazine is owned by Copesa. It was published by Empresa Periodística La Tercera, S.A. in Spanish weekly on Fridays. The headquarters of the weekly is in Santiago. It has a right-wing political stance.

In May 2018 Grupo Copesa which owns Qué Pasa announced that the print edition of the magazine folded and that it became an online-only publication.

References

External links
 

1971 establishments in Chile
2018 disestablishments in Chile
Defunct magazines published in Chile
Lifestyle magazines
Magazines established in 1971
Magazines disestablished in 2018
Mass media in Santiago
News magazines published in South America
Online magazines with defunct print editions
Spanish-language magazines
Weekly magazines